Daphnobela juncea is an extinct species of fossil predatory sea snail, a marine gastropod mollusc in the family Fasciolariidae. This species lived in the Eocene.

References

Fasciolariidae
Eocene gastropods
Molluscs described in 1766